Chan Santa Cruz  was the name of a shrine in Mexico of the Maya Cruzob (or Cruzoob) religious movement. It was also the name of the town that developed around it (now known as Felipe Carrillo Puerto) and, less formally, the late 19th-century indigenous Maya state, in what is now the Mexican state of Quintana Roo, of which it was the main center. This area was the center of the Caste War of Yucatán beginning in 1847, by which the Maya established some autonomous areas on the east side of the Yucatán Peninsula. The main conflict ended in 1915, when they agreed to recognize the Mexican government, but guerilla fighting would persist into the 1940s.

History

Pre-Columbian period

The people of the former Chan Santa Cruz state are predominantly indigenous descendants of the Maya. The northern portion of the mapped area was probably included within the state of Coba during the Classic Period. One of two successors to the defunct League of Mayapan, this state consisted of the eastern half of the Yucatán Peninsula during the decades preceding the Spanish invasion.

Early post-invasion influences include Arawak and Carib refugees from the islands, shipwrecked Spaniards and escaped African slaves.

Contact period

After the Spanish had begun to occupy areas near here, the Xiu Maya state of the western half of the peninsula, tired of fighting both the Itza' and the Spanish, allied with the Spanish Empire. This alliance subsequently inflicted massive property and population losses upon the Itza' Maya state. The Itza' state continued to train and educate indigenous Maya leaders in the sanctuaries of the southern province, Peten Itza', 'Lake of the Adepts', through the invasion and sack of the island capital Nojpetén by general Martín de Ursúa on March 13, 1697 ('6 Kimi, 9 Kank'in'). Scholars suggest that a Maya hieroglyphic manuscript, now held in Madrid, Spain, was created at Nojpetén some years after the invasion of Yucatán. This evidence includes pages from a Spanish book which were reused as writing paper for several pages of the manuscript (Coe 1998). This provenance is not universally accepted.

Uaan

The province of Uaan (meaning 'Fan Palm, Entity, State, Exist'), remained unknown to the Spanish. (For example Diego de Landa makes no mention of this province in his enumeration of Yucatecan provinces.) But, the provincial capital, Chable ('Anteater'), is mentioned several times in the books of Chilam Balam as a cycle seat (Edmonson 1984). Upon the fall of Peten Iz'a, only the Iz'a province of Uaan maintained an independent existence, and this only through strict secrecy.

Pacification

The Spanish were thoroughly occupied in 'pacifying' the Maya of the western half of the Iz'a state through the 18th century. The most famous of these campaigns was against the indigenous Kanek and his followers. This campaign finally ended with the death of the Kanek and his closest followers on December 14, 1761 ('10 Kaban, 15 Yax').

Uprising

When the Criollo class declared Yucatecan independence in the mid-19th century and began fighting over control of the resources of their infant state, the Maya leadership saw their best chance to gain independence. They had been planning this action for some time, as revealed by letters discovered in the 21st century. (These constitute written orders, through an established military chain of command, to step up the plan.) They were written in the wake of the death of the Batab of Chichimilla, Antonio Manuel Ay, on August 26, 1847 (6 Kaban, 5 Xul), in a sanctuary plaza at Saki', the sacred 'White' city of the north near present-day Vallodolid. Exactly three days after Ay's death, the eastern Maya, now identified as Uiz'oob ('Loincloths'), rose in a general uprising which nearly drove the Yucatecos entirely from Chan Santa Cruz (Huchim 1997:97–107). This uprising, reaching its high tide in 1848, called La Guerra de las Castas Caste War of Yucatan by the Mexicans, resulted in the independence of the old Iz'a Maya state. The former Xiu Maya state remained in the hands of the Yucateco Creoles. The descendants of this short-lived Maya free state and those who live like them are commonly known as Cruzoob (Reed 1964).

The independent Maya state

The State of The Cross was proclaimed in 1849, in Xocén, a south-eastern satellite of modern Valladolid where the Proclamation of Juan de la Cruz (John of the Cross) was first read to the people.  The capital, Noh Kah Balam Nah Chan Santa Cruz, was founded in about 1850 near a sacred cenote, a natural well providing a year-round source of holy water. The talking cross continues to speak at this shrine (Reed 1964, Villa Rojas 1945).

The city was laid out in the pre-Columbian Maya manner, surrounding a square with the Balam Nah, the 'Patron Saint's House', and the school at the east, the Pontiff's house at the west, the General's houses at the north, and the storehouses and market to the south (Reed 1964).

The regional capitals in Bak Halal, Chun Pom, (Vigia Chico) and Tulum, were probably laid out on the same plan as the capital.

At its greatest extent, from the 1860s through the 1890s, the Chan Santa Cruz state encompassed all of the southern and central parts of the Mexican state of Quintana Roo. With associated, buffer and splinter groups, this state was the core of a broader indigenist independence movement that controlled virtually all of the old Iz'a territories. These territories include the eastern, central and southern portions of the Yucatán peninsula, extending from Cape Catoche south to include what is now northwestern Belize and northeastern Guatemala.

The fall of the Maya free state

From the late 1850s through 1893, the United Kingdom recognized the Maya free state as a de facto independent nation, even sponsoring treaty negotiations between the Mexican hispanic Yucateco state and the Maya Cruzoob state. These negotiations resulted in a signed international treaty, which was never ratified by either party. The Maya state had extensive trade relations with the British colony of British Honduras, and its military was substantially larger than the garrison and militia in the British colony. In contrast to the Yucatecans and the Mexicans, the British found it both practical and profitable to maintain good relations with the Maya free state for some years.

All this changed after the Maya laid siege to and conquered Bacalar, originally the Mayan holy city of Bak Halal ('Decanting Water'). They summarily killed British citizens, along with the entire Yucatec 'Creoles' garrison (Reed 1964).

It is unclear why the commanding general ordered a wholesale slaughter of the garrison. Possibly he was tired of retaking the city from the more aggressive Yucateco state. Regardless, this action frightened the tiny British colonial establishment in neighboring British Honduras.

The British Government assigned Sir Spenser St. John to disentangle Her Majesty's Government from indigenous free states and the Maya free state in particular. In 1893, the British Government signed the Spenser Mariscal Treaty, which ceded all of the Maya free state's lands to Mexico. Meanwhile, the Creoles on the west side of the Yucatán peninsula had come to realize that their minority-ruled mini-state could not outlast its indigenous neighbor. After the Creoles offered their country to anyone who might consider the defense of their lives and property worth the effort, Mexico finally accepted. With both legal pretext and a convenient staging area in the western side of the Yucatán peninsula, Chan Santa Cruz was occupied by the Mexican army in the early years of the 20th century (Reed 1964).

Mexican occupation did not end resistance by the indigenous Maya, who continued to conduct guerrilla attacks against the Mexicans under the leadership of General Francisco May. In 1935, May signed a formal peace treaty with the government of Mexico.

Various treaties with Mexico were signed by the leaders of the indigenous state through the late 1930s and 1940s. These treaties, "Letters of General May", make very interesting reading today. Following General May's death, the remaining Maya officials initiated contacts with Washington, DC through the archaeologist and American spy, (Harris, Sadler 2003), Sylvanus Morley, (Sullivan 1992).

Religion

One of the notable aspects of the Maya free state was the reappearance of Maya religion in an indigenous form, sometimes called "The Cult of The Talking Cross". This was most probably a continuation of native beliefs, reemerging when the Spanish colonists' civil war released the Maya from the repressions of Yucatán's Hispanic population. The indigenous priests had maintained their ancient religious texts and their spiritual knowledge, as they continue to do today (Roys 1933, Thompson 1965).

Maya sacred books

When Friar Jacobo de Testera arrived, leading the first of the Franciscan Missions to the Maya in the second half of the 16th century, he began a Maya encyclopedia project. He intended to collect the prayers, orations, commentaries, and descriptions of native life as aids to the Spanish overthrow of Maya culture in general and the Maya religion, specifically. Diego de Landa's famous Relación de las cosas de Yucatán contains much of the Spanish explanatory text of this encyclopedia without quoting any of the indigenous texts (Tozzer 1941).

The Maya elders who participated in this project, including Juan Na Chi Kokom, former leader of the Itza' state in eastern Yucatan, were most likely willing volunteers who thought the project was a way to preserve Maya culture and religion. After the project was anathematized by the Roman Church, the former Maya collaborators collected and reconstructed as much as they could. They assembled the materials into a loose collection of texts, which is now known as the Books of Chilam Balam (Roys 1933).

The Books of Chilam Balam ('Spokesman of the Patron'), (Barrera Vasquez 1948, Roys 1933, Edmonson 1982, 1987, Bricker & Miram 2001). Existing copies of these books from Calkiní, Chan Kan, Chumayel, Ixil, Kaua, Maní, Tixkakal and Tizimín, present evidence for distinct Xiu and Itza' recensions. (Barrera Vasquez 1948). Usually translated as a collection of historical and mythological texts, this book contains a great deal of information specifically pertaining to the ancient Maya Calendar and the priests who maintained it.

Contents of the Books of Chilam Balam include daily reminders for diviners; natal charts for each day; rituals associated with each day; direction for the selection, training and initiation of Maya calendar priests; a Maya rosary prayer, a divination prayer, sacrifices at the sacred well of Chich'en Itza', auto sacrifice, pilgrimage places, the Maya years and cycles, advice to a woman seven months pregnant, and Maya family life.

The Songs of Dzitbalche, (Barrera Vasquez 1965) is a collection of songs, prayers and ritual speeches. This collection includes traditional girls' songs, prayers for seating images, and others.

The Ritual of the Bakabs, (Roys 1965, Marin 1987, etc.) is usually translated as a collection of medical texts. The first half of this book is comparable to the books of Chilam Balam of Chumayel and Tizimin and contains Maya songs, advice, prayers and ritual speeches. These texts include one on the Maya Pontiff, one on the Chiuoh lineage, one on seers, several for novice diviners, a midwife's prayer and a renewal prayer for the divining seeds. The second half of this book is comparable to the second half of the Chilam Balam of Kauá and Maya herbals; it also contains mostly herbal, medical remedies for a wide variety of ailments. Maya Herbals, (Roys 1931, Ethnobotany of the Maya).

The Maya Church

Shortly after Yucatan was declared an independent state, the Yucatán Peninsula was divided into two independent warring states: a Hispanic state in the west that kept the Maya in a slave status, and a Maya free state in the east. For the first time in centuries, the Maya were in charge of a state that supported their indigenous faith. (The Roman Church had consistently refused to ordain native Maya even as priests.) Previously, the village lay assistants, maestros cantores, who were sons of Maya priests, often acted as members of their fathers' profession as well, (Clendenin 1978).

The Maya church in every Crusero village and town, houses the Holy Cross in her sanctuary. Maya churches are easily distinguished from Roman churches by the presence of a walled inner sanctum, the gloria, inside the Maya church (Villa Rojas 1945).

God and his angels
 K'u, 'God', is one, undepictable and incorporeal, (Motul Dictionary).
 Hunab K'u, 'Unique God', (Motul Dictionary).
 Hahal K'u, 'True God', (Motul Dictionary).
 Tepal, 'Lord', epithet for God and His Angels, (Motul Dictionary).
 Ahau, 'Lord', epithet for God and His Angels, (Motul Dictionary).
 Yumil Kaan, 'Father of the Sky', widespread indigenous epithet for God and His Angels (Berendt 1888).
 Chakoob, 'Angels', are God's active force, who manifest his will on earth and can be petitioned for aid. There are 1, 4, 5, 6, or 7 Chakoob, one for each direction addressed in a particular ritual. The directions are color-coded along with their Chakoob. Thus, east is red, north is white, west is black, south is yellow, sky is blue, earth is green and the center is clear (Thompson 1965).
 Kiichpam Kolel, 'Beautiful Grandmother', U Kolel Cab, Grandmother Earth, Guadelupe, any of the feminine principles of the universe, (Gann 1888, Thompson 1933, Villa Rojas 1945). She and the other feminine spirits are autonomous and can be petitioned for good through prayers before her cross or image.
 Yumz'iloob, 'Fathers', Patrilineage Ancestors, are autonomous and can be petitioned for good or ill through prayers before the appropriate lineage crosses, (Villa Rojas 1945).
 Balam, 'Jaguar', Patron of the village, town, province, state, nation which acts as agent and protector for the social unit in question, (Proskouriakoff 1961, Villa Rojas 1945).
 Balamoob, 'Jaguars', Twenty Patrons of the days of the 260-day Sacred Round, the four Yearbearers of the 365-day year, the Ahauoob of the 360-day year, and the K'atun, (Proskouriakoff 1961, Villa Rojas 1945).
 Ik'oob, 'Spirits', are autonomous and can be petitioned for good or ill, (Villa Rojas 1945).
 K'asal Ik'oob, 'Evil Spirits', are autonomous and chaotic and must be exorcized before any ritual can begin, and appeased before any ritual can end, (Villa Rojas 1945).
 Ix Ceel, 'Little Tree', family devotional cross, (Roys 1965).

Worship

There are two great annual festivals, both descended from the two great annual festivals of the pre-Columbian Maya. U K'in Crus (The Day of The Cross) is the ancient Maya New (365-day) Year Festival and U K'in Kolel (The Feast of Our Grandmother, Guadelupe), is the ancient Maya New (360-day) 'Year' Festival.

The Crusoob also celebrate a Mass and Novenas, which always include offerings of corn tortillas and typically tamales, meat, fruit, atole, pepper, chocolate, a dessert and an alcoholic beverage, (Villa Rojas 1945).

The Holy Cross

The Holy Cross must be guarded and fed several times a day. Every householder has a small domestic cross clothed in a diminutive huipil ('woman's dress') and with a mirror hung around its neck. This little female cross was known in Pre-Columbian times as Ix Cel ('Little/female Tree'). In addition to the village patron cross and the household crosses, there are special Lineage Crosses for important lines, four Guardian Crosses at the entrances to town, and others that guard sinkholes and wells, (Villa Rojas 1945). The religion of the people in the 21st century is quite mixed, with some devoted exclusively to the indigenous church and its ritual calendar. Others are exclusively or partially Roman Catholic, Protestant or Evangelical.

The shrines of the "Talking crosses" remain a vital part of the local culture into the 21st century. As recently as 2002, the Mexican Government finally lifted the stigma of witchcraft, to which indigenous priests had been subject under Mexican Civil and Roman Church law. They recognized the Church of the Talking Cross as a legitimate religion, (plaque on shrine in Carrillo Puerto).

National records

The 'Proclamation of Juan de la Cruz', El Proclamo in Spanish, is the Maya free state's formal declaration of independence. Appended to the Proclamation are the state's constitution and by-laws. In addition to responsibilities for military service (the constitution was written in time of war) and support for the indigenous church, the Maya people (and those of any race) who consented to the sovereignty of the new state were guaranteed equal and fair treatment, (Bricker 1981).

Official correspondence and international treaties of the Maya state
 Treaties with the Yucateco state.
 Treaty with the Yucateco state sponsored by the British Government in Hondouras (11 Jan. 1884).
 Treaties with the British Government.
 Official correspondence with Washington, (Sullivan 1992).
 Treaties with the Mexican Government, (Correspondence of General May)
 Treaties of the Guatemalan Government.
 Treaties of the Yucateco state.
 Treaties between Mexico and the British Government. (The Spenser Mariscal Treaty, 1893).

Officials

Most Maya religious offices are unpaid or are paid by donations from wealthy and/or devout members of the community. These officials are typically among the oldest and most impoverished of the people, having distributed most of their personal property to finance the associated community festivals, (Redfield and Villa Rojas 1962).

Religious officials
 Ahau Kan, Ah Z'ab Kan, 'Lord Wisdom', 'He Rattle Snake', the Supreme Pontiff of the Maya church, now known as Nohoch Tata, 'Great Father', (Tozzer 1941, Villa Rojas 1945).
 Kan Ek', 'Wise Star', one of four Cardinals who held forth from the four holy cities: Bakhalal, now Bacalar, in the east, Sakil, Spanish Valladolid, in the north, Ich Kan Si Ho', Spanish Merida, in the west, and Cham Putun, now 'Champoton', in the south, disused, (Edmonson 1984).
 Ek', 'Star', one of eight Archbishops in the Maya church, disused, (Motul Dictionary).
 Cho'op, 'Macaw', one of twenty Provincials or Bishops in the Maya Church, disused. Only the Province of Uaan now survives, the Cho'opil Uaan is now the Supreme Pontiff of the Maya church and is known as the Nohoch Tata, (Motul Dictionary, Villa Rojas 1945).
 The first Nohoch Tata was Manual Nahuat, 1847 until his death on March 23, 1851.
 K'in, 'Sun', one of eighty Priests, sometimes identified in Spanish as Sacerdote, in the Maya Church. A diviner, one of a multitude who employs the Maya Sacred Calendar of 20 daily patrons and thirteen daily personalities/numbers, disused, (Motul Dictionary, Tedlock 1982).
 Ik', 'Spirit', an Exorcista, a blessing, (Motul Dictionary, Roys 1933).
 Uay, 'Familiar Spirit', 'Nagual', a Medium, one with good relations in the spirit world, (Motul Dictionary, Redfield 194x).
 K'ay, 'Fish', a Cantor, (Motul Dictionary).
 T'an, 'Word', Rezador, an Orator, (Motul Dictionary).
 Le, 'Leaf', Yerbatero, a Herbalist, (Motul Dictionary).

Civil officials
 Halac Uinik, 'Real Man, Presidente Municipal, is a civil official at the level of provincial governor or higher, (Motul Dictionary). The first Halach Uinik at Chan Santa Cruz was Jose Maria Barrera, who held the position until his assassination in 1852.
 Batab, 'Hatchet', Delegado, is the local civil official at the village level or lower, (Motul Dictionary).
 Tupil, 'Earring', 'Novice', 'Alderman', is the entry level civil official at the village level or lower, including the Kambesah, 'Teacher' and the Kanan K'u, 'Sacristan', (Motul Dictionary).

Military officials
 Ahau K'atun Kiuik', General de la Plaza, (Motul Dictionary, Villa Rojas 1945). The supreme commander of Maya military forces. This position was held by several different individuals. There is some evidence that the first, most effective and longest serving General of the Plaza was Bernardino Cen (Sullivan 1992). The last fully recognized General of the Plaza was General May, who signed the final peace treaties with the Mexican government through the 1930s and 1940s. Subsequent attempts to revive the generalship have failed to garner the support of the community as a whole and the military survives primarily as an honor guard for the Maya Church.
 Ahau K'atun, General, there are four of these, one for each direction. Nonetheless, during the war of liberation it was the generals of the north and of the south who garnered the most space in the Spanish and British colonial press, (Motul Dictionary, Villa Rojas 1945).
 The first General of The North was Cecilio Chi, victor at Valladolid and Iz'amal, 1847 until his death in May, 1849. The second General of The North was Venancio Pec, 1849–1852.
 The first General of The South was Jacinto Pat, victor at Peto, Tekax, Tikul, 1847 until his assassination in December, 1849. The second General of The South was Florentino Chan, 1849–1852.
 Coronel
 Major
 Ah K'atun, Capitan, (Motul Dictionary, Villa Rojas 1945)
 Teniente
 Sergento
 Caporal
 K'atun, Soldado, 'Private, Soldier in general', (Motul Dictionary, Villa Rojas 1945)

Traditional occupations
 Konol, 'Seller', is a member of the merchant class which, while maintaining homes in the communities, does little farming and travels frequently from market to market in search of the best prices, (Motul Dictionary, Redfiel and Villa Rojas 1962).
 Ah Pak, Ah Nun Baal,  Spanish: Albañil, 'Waller', 'Immovable Thing', is a mason, (Motul Dictionary, Redfield and Villa Rojas 1962).
 Ah Kab, 'Beekeeper', (Motul Dictionary, Redfield and Villa Rojas 1962).
 Ah Men Che,  Spanish: Carpintero, Carpenter, (Motul Dictionary, etc.).
 K'ol Nal,  Spanish: Granjero, 'Farm Corn', is the largest class consisting of subsistence farmers, (Motul Dictionary, etc.).

See also
 Caste War of Yucatan
 Kakure Kirishitan, a Japanese evolution of Catholicism after the interdiction of ordained priests.
 Index of Mexico-related articles

References

 Arzapalo Marín, Ramón, 1987, El Ritual de los Bacabes, UNAM, Mexico.
 Ávila Zapata, Felipe Nery, 1974, El General May: Último jefe de las tribus mayas. Ediciones del Gobierno del Estado de Yucatán: Coleccion páginas de nuestra Historia, Mérida, Yucatán, Mexico.
 Barrera Vásquez, Alfredo, 1948, El Libro de los libros de Chilam Balam. Ediciones Porrúa, Mexico, Mexico.
 Berendt, 1888. The Lord's Prayer in three languages, Smithsonian Institution, Washington.
 Bricker, Victoria, 1981 The Indian Christ, The Indian King: the indigenous substrate of Maya myth and ritual. University of Texas Press, Austin.
 Bricker, Victoria and Miram, 2001. The Book of Chilam Balam of Kaua.
 Ciudad Real, Antonio?, 1604? Calepino Maya. (Motul Dictionary).
 Cogolludo, Tomas, Lopez (1688), Historia de Yucatan
 Clendenin, Inga, 1978. Ambivalent Conquest: Spaniard and Maya in the Yucatan peninsula.
 Chamberlan, 19xx. Materials for a bibliography of the cast war in Yucatan.
 Coe, Michael, 1998. Art of the Maya Scribe.
 Landa, Diego de, 1941. Relación de las cosas de Yucatan. (Alfred M.Tozzer, trans.) Harvard University Press, Cambridge.
 Edmonson, Munroe, 1984. The Ancient Future of the Itz'a: The Book of Chilam Balam of Tizimin. University of Texas Press, Austin.
 Edmonson, Munroe, 1987. Heaven Born Merida: The book of Chilam Balam of Chumayel. University of Texas Press, Austin.
 Gann, Thomas, 188x. Explorations in British Honduras ?.
 Harris, Charles & Sadler Louis, 2003. The Archaeologist was a Spy.
 Martinez Huchim, Patricia, 1997. "The Uprising of the Men in Loincloths". Guerra de las Castas en Yucatán, Sastun, ano. #1, Mérida.
 Proskouriakoff, Tatiana, 1961. "Lords of the Maya Realm". Expedition Magazine, 4.1.
 Reed, Nelson, 1964. The Caste War in Yucatan. Stanford: Stanford University Press 1964.
 Roys, Ralph, 1931. The Ethnobotany of the Maya. Middle American Research Series, Publication 2, New Orleans.
 Roys, Ralph, 1933. The Book of Chilam Balam of Chumayel. Carnegie Institution of Washington, Publication 438, Washington.
 Roys, Ralph, 1965. The Ritual of the Bacabs, University of Oklahoma Press, Norman.
 Redfield, Robert & Villa Rojas, 1962. Chan Kom: a Maya Village. Field Museum of Natural History, Chicago.
 Sullivan, Paul, 1992. Unfinished Conversations: Mayas and Foreigners between Two Wars. New York.
 Tedlock, Barbara, 1982. Time and the Highland Maya. University of New Mexico Press, Albuquerque.
 Thompson, J.E.S. 1933. Explorations in British Honduras. Field Museum of Natural History, Chicago.
 Thompson, J.E.S., 1965. Maya History and Religion. University of Oklahoma Press, Norman.
 Villa Rojas, Alfonso, 1945. The Maya of East Central Quintana Roo, Mexico. Carnegie Institution of Washington Publication 559, Washington.

Further reading
 Careaga Viliesid, Lorena. Chan Santa Cruz: Historia de unacomunidad cimarrona de Quintana Roo. Thesis in social anthropology. Mexico City: Universidad Iberoamericana1981.
 Dumond, Don E. The Machete and the Cross: Campesino Rebellion in Yucatan. Lincoln: University of Nebraska Press 1997.

External links
 A visit to Chan Santa Cruz, Colonial Mexico

Former territorial entities in North America
Former countries of Mexico
History of the Yucatán Peninsula
Independent Mexico
Quintana Roo
History of Quintana Roo
Maya peoples
1850 establishments in Mexico
1850 in Mexico
Maya history
Former republics